Medicus A. Long (died September 22, 1885) was a lawyer from Tennessee who served one term in Tennessee's General Assembly.  He spent a short time as a publisher in Tennessee. He married Ellen Call, Florida Territorial Governor Richard K. Call's daughter who became Ellen Call Long. They had four children but only the oldest and youngest children survived to adulthood: Richard Call Long and Eleanora Long Hollinger. He was a secessionist.

References

Further reading
Texans who wore the gray by Sid Johnson

Year of birth missing
1885 deaths
19th-century American lawyers
Members of the Tennessee General Assembly
Tennessee lawyers
Place of birth missing
Place of death missing
American publishers (people)